Máirín de Burca (born 1938) is an Irish writer, journalist and activist. She is particularly well known in her role with Mary Anderson, of forcing a change in Irish law to enable women to serve on juries.

Activism
A leading Sinn Féin and Official Sinn Féin member (General Secretary for 11 years), de Burca was a founding member of the Irish Women's Liberation Movement in 1970. She was also a member of the Dublin Housing Action Committee, formed in May 1967, the Irish Voice on Vietnam, the Irish Anti-Apartheid movement,  the Prisoner's Rights Organisation and Right to Die Ireland. As an activist she has been jailed for 3 months (for her anti-Vietnam War activities where she took down the flag and burnt it) and fined (for her attacks on Richard Nixon's car during a visit to Ireland) during 1970. In 1971 the Contraceptive Train was organised by the Irish Women's Liberation Movement. This was a train to Northern Ireland so that women could buy contraceptives and openly bring them back to the Republic. This subject was delicate and de Burca made the active decision not to go as she feared the reaction because she was not married at the time.

She has been involved in a legal case which changed Irish law and Ireland. The two litigants were represented in court by Mary Robinson and Donal Barrington. That case allowed for the Juries Act 1976 which now allows any Irish citizen aged 18 or over who is registered to vote in general elections to be involved in a jury.
Despite her activism, de Burca is considered a militant pacifist.

In 2017 de Burca was awarded the Honorary degree of Doctor of Law by University College Dublin.

Further reading
Dublin Housing Action Committee
An informal meeting with Mairin de Burca of Sinn Fein / interviewed by Tim McGovern and Susan Anderson.
Irish history in perspective / Mairin de Burca ; produced by Tim McGovern.
Women To Blame
The Better Side: Máirín de Burca
Irish Women’s Movement 2000

References

Irish socialist feminists
Living people
1938 births
Sinn Féin politicians
Workers' Party (Ireland) politicians